Route 98 is a highway in Cooper County.  It stretches for 9.5 miles through a mostly rural area of Missouri.

Route description
In the west, Route 98 begins at Business Loop Interstate 70/Route 87 in Booneville. It proceeds eastward, traversing a largely rural area. Upon reaching Orchard Drive, Route 98 turns due south, but soon resumes an eastward course as it passes near the Jesse Viertel Memorial Airport. The highway approaches I-70, which it generally parallels for its entire length. Route 98 reaches its closest proximity to I-70 when it meets a junction with Route 179. It turns northeast and loses its designation at a railroad crossing and transitions into Cumberland Church Road, south of the Missouri River.

Major intersections

References

098
Transportation in Cooper County, Missouri

External links